, also known as Kujō-dono or Bōjō-udaijin, was a Japanese statesman, courtier and politician during the middle Heian period. Considered a learned scholar and well-versed in the customs of the court, he supported the court's government as udaijin during the reign of Emperor Murakami. Morosuke's eldest daughter Fujiwara no Anshi, empress consort to Emperor Murakami, gave birth to two princes who later became Emperor Reizei and Emperor En'yū, putting Morosuke's lineage in an advantageous position as the maternal relatives of the Emperor.

Life
Morosuke was born the second son of Fujiwara no Tadahira, who controlled the government for many years as sekkan (regent) and daijō-daijin. Around 930 he had an affair with a daughter of Emperor Daigo, Princess Kinshi, and was later permitted to marry her. This was the first time a non-imperial Japanese retainer married an imperial princess — in previous cases where retainers married the daughters of emperors, those daughters had first been divested of their imperial status. From 931 to 947 he was steadily promoted, passing through the position of sangi and attaining the post of provisional chūnagon.

The court debated Tadabumi's honors, and Morosuke's older brother Saneyori argued that as Tadabumi had not done anything, he should not be granted any prize. Morosuke argued that as Tadabumi had accepted his orders and set out from the capital, he should still be rewarded. Saneyori stuck to his own position, but public opinion favored Morosuke.

In 947, Emperor Suzaku abdicated, and Emperor Murakami ascended to the throne. Promotion naturally favored the eldest son and family heir, but Morosuke was considered excellent enough to cause problems for his older brother in spite of this: Morosuke held more real power than even Saneyori. Morosuke had married his eldest daughter Anshi to Murakami while he was still the crown prince. With his enthronement she became a court lady and assisted the emperor often, and when she bore him the future Emperor Reizei Anshi was made chūgū. As the maternal grandfather of the crown prince, Morosuke and his cohorts were able to lead the court by Murakami's side for about ten years.

After the death of his wife Princess Kinshi, Morosuke married Princess Gashi, and when she died Princess Yasuko, all of whom were daughters of Emperor Daigo, thus further deepening his ties with the imperial line. Because he had affairs with and then married three different imperial princesses, Morosuke may have been the model for a character in the Utsubo Monogatari, the ultimate lecher, Fujiwara no Kanemasa.

In 960 Morosuke was laid out by illness, and according to the customs of the day attempted to cut his hair and take the tonsure, but Emperor Murakami sent a messenger to dissuade him. Even so, his sickness worsened, and on May 29 he cut off his hair, only to die two days later on May 31, 960, at the age of 53.

Morosuke never held the position of sekkan in his life, but the successive reigns of his grandchildren Emperor Reizei and Emperor En'yū after Murakami's death put his family in an outstanding position as the emperor's maternal relatives. His eldest son Koretada briefly held power as sekkan, and his other sons Kanemichi, Kaneie, Tamemitsu, and Kinsue also all attained the position of daijō-daijin. In Morosuke's children's generation, his descendants were the legitimate line of the Fujiwara regent family.

Personality and works 
Morosuke and his older brother Saneyori, both educated by Fujiwara no Tadahira, each formed their own school of the practices and traditions of the court. The talented Takaakira flourished with Morosuke's support.

Morosuke was also an excellent poet, leaving behind a collection of his works simply called . In 956 he held a party in his garden, and the Ōkagami contains an anecdote about his visit to Ki no Tsurayuki to request that the latter write a poem for him. Thirty-six of Morosuke's poems are included in the Gosen Wakashū.

His personal diary  and the dying instructions he left for his descendants, are also preserved.

Genealogy
Father: Fujiwara no Tadahira
Mother: , daughter of Minamoto Yoshiari
Wife: , daughter of 
First son: Fujiwara no Koretada (924-972)
Second son: Fujiwara no Kanemichi (925-977)
Third son: Fujiwara no Kaneie (929-990)
Fifth son: , adopted by Fujiwara no Tadahira
First daughter: Fujiwara no Anshi (927–964), wife of Emperor Murakami, mother of Emperor Reizei and Emperor En'yū
Third daughter: wife of 
Sixth daughter: , court lady of Emperor Reizei, naishi-no-kami
Wife: daughter of 
Fourth son: 
Seventh son: 
Wife: daughter of 
Sixth son: 
Wife: , daughter of Emperor Daigo
Wife: , daughter of Emperor Daigo, Saiō of Ise Shrine
Eighth son: Fujiwara no Takamitsu (939-994)
Ninth son: 
Tenth son: , Tendai school Buddhist monk
Fifth daughter: , wife of Minamoto no Takaakira
Wife: , daughter of Emperor Daigo
Eleventh son: , head managing monk of Tōdai-ji
Twelfth son: Fujiwara no Kinsue (956-1029)
Other children:
Daughter: , wetnurse to Emperor Ichijō, mistress of Fujiwara no Michikane, wife of 
Daughter: wife of 

Morosuke managed to marry his daughters to Emperor Murakami; the sons of his daughter Empress Anshi/Yasuko became Emperor Reizei and Emperor En'yū. The reigns of Reizei and En'yū are remarkable for quarrels among the members of the Fujiwara family. Koretada's daughter gave birth to Prince Morosada, who afterwards reigned as Emperor Kazan Kaneie's daughter was the mother of Okisada, who became Emperor Sanjo

Notes

References
 Brinkley, Frank and Dairoku Kikuchi. (1915). A History of the Japanese People from the Earliest Times to the End of the Meiji Era. New York: Encyclopædia Britannica. OCLC 413099
 Nussbaum, Louis-Frédéric and Käthe Roth. (2005).  Japan encyclopedia. Cambridge: Harvard University Press. ;  OCLC 58053128
 Titsingh, Isaac. (1834). Nihon Odai Ichiran; ou,  Annales des empereurs du Japon.  Paris: Royal Asiatic Society, Oriental Translation Fund of Great Britain and Ireland. OCLC 5850691

Fujiwara clan
909 births
960 deaths
People of Heian-period Japan
Heian period Buddhist clergy